Christian Birmingham is a British illustrator and artist who has worked with children's writers including the Children's Laureate Michael Morpurgo, on books including Whitbread Children's Book of the Year The Wreck of the Zanzibar and Smarties Prize winner The Butterfly Lion. He was also shortlisted for the Kurt Maschler Award and Kate Greenaway Medal for illustration.

Birmingham graduated from Exeter College of Art and Design in 1991 with a first-class honours degree in Graphic Design (illustration). He won his first book illustration contract soon after leaving college and has since worked with major British and American publishers on titles including the centenary picturebook edition of C. S. Lewis's The Lion, The Witch and the Wardrobe and Clement C. Moore's classic poem The Night Before Christmas (which has sold more than 1.5 million copies). He has also illustrated two sets of Royal Mail special stamps, to commemorate 100 years of the Rugby league and the centenary of the birth of children's author Enid Blyton.

Christian's illustration artwork has been shown at the Australian High Commission, to celebrate the publication of Wombat Goes Walkabout, and at the Air Gallery in Mayfair and Mall Galleries in Westminster, London in exhibitions hosted by Books Illustrated Ltd in December 2007 and 2009 to celebrate the publication of The Snow Queen and The Little Mermaid. His landscape artwork has been exhibited at the Royal Society of Marine Artists, Pastel Society and New English Art Club annual exhibitions.

Selected books illustrated 

 A Christmas Carol
 The Lion, the Witch and the Wardrobe
 Little Farmer Joe
 Oliver Twist
 The Classic Tales of Hans Christian Andersen
 Wombat Goes Walkabout
 Sleeping Beauty
 The Night Before Christmas
 Wenceslas
 The Snow Queen
 The Little Mermaid
 A Midsummer Night's Dream
 Wuthering Heights
 Tod and the Clock Angel
 Dick King-Smith's Countryside Treasury
 A Baby for Grace
 A Kitten Called Moonlight
 The Magical Bicycle
 The Silver Swan
 This Morning I Met a Whale
 The Butterfly Lion
  Shadow

External links
 
 Short biography at Art of the Imagination, BooksIllustrated.com
 

British children's book illustrators
Living people
Year of birth missing (living people)
Place of birth missing (living people)